The Sverdrup Islands is an archipelago of the northern Queen Elizabeth Islands, in Nunavut, Canada. The islands are situated in the Arctic Ocean, west of Ellesmere Island from 77° to 81° North and 85° to 106° West.

History 
The islands are named after Norwegian explorer Otto Sverdrup, who explored and mapped them from 1898 to 1902 with the vessel Fram, although some were previously inhabited by Inuit. Sverdrup claimed the islands for Norway, but the Norwegian government showed no interest in pursuing the claim until 1928. At that point, the Norwegian government raised the claim, primarily to use the islands as bargaining chips in negotiations with the United Kingdom over the status of two other islands: the Arctic Jan Mayen and the Antarctic Bouvet Island. On 11 November 1930, Norway recognized Canadian sovereignty over the Sverdrup Islands. On 19 November 1930, the UK recognized Norwegian sovereignty over Jan Mayen.

Geography 
The main islands of the group are Axel Heiberg Island, Ellef Ringnes Island, Amund Ringnes Island, Cornwall Island, Graham Island, Meighen Island, King Christian Island, Stor Island, and the archipelago also includes a number of smaller islands in the surrounding waters. The only inhabited place was Isachsen, a formerly staffed weather station, 1948 through 1978, on Ellef Ringnes Island and McGill Arctic Research Station on Axel Heiberg Island (a research station occupied during the summer).

Main islands

See also

Former colonies and territories in Canada
Territorial evolution of Canada after 1867

References

External links
 University of Guelph Ringnes Islands 
 Nunatsiaq News - Canada secures High Arctic sovereignty
 Official site of the Fram Museum (Frammuseet)

 
Archipelagoes of the Canadian Arctic Archipelago
Former Norwegian colonies
Uninhabited islands of Qikiqtaaluk Region
Queen Elizabeth Islands